South Carolina government and politics covers the three different branches of government, as well as the state constitution, law enforcement agencies, federal representation, state finances, and state taxes. South Carolina is a state in the United States of America and was the eighth admitted to the Union. The state of South Carolina was preceded by the Crown Colony of South Carolina, a constitutional monarchy which was overthrown during the American Revolution. Presently, South Carolina's government is formed as a representative democracy.

South Carolina is a largely conservative, Republican state. Since the Declaration of Independence, South Carolina's politics have been controlled by three main parties: the Democratic Republican Party in the early 1800s, the Democratic Party through most of the 19th and 20th centuries, and the Republican Party in the late 20th and early 21st centuries.

Like most Southern states, South Carolina consistently voted Democratic in the 19th century and much of the 20th century as a part of the Solid South. The Democratic block was largely maintained by the disenfranchisement of most black voters from 1865 to the passage of the Civil Rights Act of 1964. The Republican Party became competitive in the 1960 presidential election when Richard Nixon lost the state to John F. Kennedy by just two percentage points. In 1964, Barry Goldwater became the first Republican to win the state since Reconstruction.

Since the election of 1964, South Carolina has voted for the Republican party in every presidential election, with the exception of 1976 when Jimmy Carter, a southern Democrat, was elected president. However, in state-wide and local elections, conservative Democrats still won many races until the end of the 20th century. The last conservative Democratic governor to be elected in South Carolina was Jim Hodges in 1998, and the last conservative Democratic U.S. Senator to serve was Fritz Hollings until 2005. Until the 1990s, South Carolina had a majority Democratic representation in both the U.S. House of Representatives and the General Assembly of South Carolina. While South Carolina has shifted between the Democratic and Republican parties, politics in South Carolina has consistently been conservative. As of 2023, the Republican Party controls all nine state executive offices, both U.S. Senate offices, six of seven representatives to the U.S. House of Representatives, and a majority in the South Carolina General Assembly.

Current Party Control

Executive branch

Governor and Lieutenant Governor 

The Governor of South Carolina is the chief executive of the state. The governor is elected to a four-year term and may serve up to two consecutive terms. The current governor is Republican Henry McMaster who succeeded to the office of Governor of South Carolina when Governor Nikki Haley resigned to become the United States Ambassador to the United Nations. The Lieutenant Governor is the second-in-command of the state's executive branch. The Lt. Governor assumes the office if the Governor is unable to fulfill his or her duties. Prior to the 2018 gubernatorial election, Governors and Lieutenant Governors were elected on separate tickets. But for the 2018 election and beyond, the governor and lieutenant governor run on the same ticket.

Elected Cabinet 

The South Carolina Constitution provides for the separate election of eight executive officers, making a limited cabinet. This is a large number of elective offices compared to most states, which generally give the governor the executive power to appoint members of the cabinet.

Each officer is elected at the same time as the governor. The separately elected positions allow for the possibility of multiple parties to be represented in the executive branch. The Governor's Cabinet also contains several appointed positions. In most cases, persons who fill cabinet-level positions are recommended by the governor and appointed by the Senate.

Legislative branch 

The South Carolina General Assembly is the state legislature. It is bicameral, consisting of a 124-member South Carolina House of Representatives and a 46-member South Carolina Senate. Representatives serve two-year terms and Senators serve four-year terms. The two houses meet in the South Carolina State House. Each house is currently controlled by the Republican Party.

Originally, each county elected one senator and at least one representative.  The vast differences between rural and urban counties gave rural areas an outsized influence over state government.  This state of affairs ended with the federal case of Reynolds v. Sims, which mandated that state legislative districts be drawn based on population, and that that counties’ representatives must be roughly equal.

Historic Party Control 
Below is a chart of party control in the South Carolina General Assembly since 1868.

Judicial branch 
The Family Court deals with all matters of domestic and family relationships, as well as generally maintaining exclusive jurisdiction over cases involving minors under the age of seventeen, excepting traffic and game law violations. Some criminal charges may come under Circuit Court jurisdiction.

The South Carolina Circuit Court is the trial court of general jurisdiction court for South Carolina. It consists of a civil division (the Court of Common Pleas) and a criminal division. (the Court of General Sessions). It is also a superior court, having limited appellate jurisdiction over appeals from the lower Probate Court, Magistrate's Court, and Municipal Court, and appeals from the Administrative Law Judge Division, which hears matters relating to state administrative and regulatory agencies. South Carolina's 46 counties are divided into 16 judicial circuits, and there are currently 46 judges. Circuit court judges are elected by the General Assembly to six-year terms.

The South Carolina Court of Appeals is the state intermediate appellate court. It hears all Circuit Court and Family Court appeals, excepting appeals that are within the seven classes of exclusive Supreme Court jurisdiction. The Court of Appeals is selected by the General Assembly to long six-year terms. The court comprises a chief judge, and eight associate judges, and may hear cases as the whole court, or as three panels with three judges each. The court may preside in any county.

The South Carolina Supreme Court is the state supreme court. The Chief Justice and four Associate Justices are elected to staggered ten-year terms. There are no limits on the number of terms a justice may serve, but there is a mandatory retirement age of 72. The overwhelming majority of vacancies on the Court occur when Justices reach this age, not through the refusal of the General Assembly to elect a sitting Justice to another term.

Law

South Carolina Constitution 

South Carolina has had seven constitutions:
 1776 – SC's first constitution
 1778 – Disestablished the Anglican Church, created a popularly elected upper house
 1790 – Expanded upcountry representation, further established General Assembly control over all aspects of government
 1861 – Confederate constitution
 1865 – Required to be readmitted to the Union, abolished property owning qualifications to vote, created popularly elected governor and granted veto power
 1868 – Only constitution to be ratified by popular vote, provided for public education, abolished property ownership as a qualification for office holding, created counties with home rule, abolished race as limit on male suffrage
 1895 – effectively disenfranchised black voters, requiring poll taxes, and literacy tests, to register to vote. In 1900 African Americans were 58% of the state population. This exclusion of blacks from the political system was largely enforced until after passage of the Voting Rights Act of 1965, which authorized federal oversight and enforcement of voter registration and elections to ensure citizens could exercise their constitutional rights.

Since 1895, many residents have called for a new Constitution, one that is not based on the politics of a post-Civil War population. Governor Mark Sanford called for constitutional reform in his 2008 State of the State speech. Several hundred amendments have been made to the 1895 Constitution (in 1966 there were 330 amendments). Amendments have been created to comply with federal acts, and for many other issues. The volume of amendments makes South Carolina's constitution one of the longest in the nation.

Law enforcement agencies 
 South Carolina Department of Public Safety
 South Carolina Highway Patrol Division
 South Carolina State Transport Police Division
 South Carolina Bureau of Protective Services
 South Carolina Criminal Justice Academy
 South Carolina Department of Corrections
 SC Department of Corrections Training Academy
 SC Department of Corrections Tactical Teams (Rapid Response Team-S.O.R.T.-Sitcon)
 SC Department of Juvenile Justice
 South Carolina Department of Probation, Parole and Pardon Services
 South Carolina State Law Enforcement Division (SLED)
 Homeland Security
 South Carolina Department of Natural Resources
 South Carolina Climatology Department
 South Carolina Department of Alcohol and Other Drug Abuse Services
 South Carolina Department of Mental Health

Local government 

Historically, local governments in South Carolina have been fairly weak. For the most part, until the 1830s, towns were controlled by districts. According to historian Tom Downey, "the movement for incorporation initiated with a desire to implant order on unruly elements...which growing villages seemed to attract all too frequently." The initial charters gave towns regulatory power which they used to "appoint constables, levy fines, and enact ordinances."  But, town councils were largely unable to pay their expenses with funds raised by just their fine revenue. In the late 1830s, the General Assembly started allowing select towns to tax property within their corporate limits.

The 1867 constitution established home rule for counties. This was changed under the 1895 Constitution, which made no provision for local government and effectively reduced counties to creatures of the state.  Each county's delegation to the General Assembly also doubled as its county council.  Under this system, the state senator from each county exercised the most power.  Reynolds v. Sims required reapportionment according to the principle of "one man, one vote", which resulted in legislative districts crossing county lines.  However, it was not until 1973 that the constitution was amended to provide for limited home rule at the county level. The Home Rule Act in 1975 implemented this.  This law provided for elected councils in each county.  Nonetheless, the legislature still devotes considerable time to local issues, and county legislative delegations still decide many matters that are handled at the county level in most other states.

Municipal governments may incorporate as cities or towns.  However, there is no legal difference between the two.  

Compared to cities in neighboring states, South Carolina cities are fairly small in size and population, since state law makes annexation difficult. To expand their borders, cities in South Carolina generally have three options when annexing contiguous land. First, if all property owners in a given area of land sign and file a petition with the municipality requesting annexation, the municipality may approve the petition and enact an ordinance declaring the annexation. Second, 75% of the freeholders in an area owning 75% or more of the assessed property value in that area may file a petition for annexation which the municipality may approve. More stringent petition requirements are added due to the lowered petitioner threshold. Finally, 25% of electors in an area can file a petition to initiate an annexation election which in turn requires a majority of voters to approve the annexation. This option previously required that 25% of freeholders file the petition for an election, but that was found to be a violation of the Equal Protection Clause.

Federal and State Representation

US Senate 
The current South Carolina delegation to the U.S. Senate:

US House of Representatives 
South Carolina currently has seven representatives in Congress:

A district map is found here.

Judicary
South Carolina is part of the United States District Court for the District of South Carolina in the federal judiciary. The district's cases are appealed to the Richmond-based United States Court of Appeals for the Fourth Circuit.

Finances 
The state does not allow casino gambling, but it authorized the operation of video poker machines throughout the state. This yielded revenue of approximately $2 billion per year deposited into the state's coffers. But, in 2000 the legislature banned video poker, requiring machines to be shut off and removed from the state by July 8.

Taxes 
The state's personal income tax has a maximum marginal tax rate of 7 percent on taxable income of $13,351 and above.

State sales tax revenues are used exclusively for education. South Carolina has a 6% state sales tax, but when combined with local and county taxes, South Carolina has the second-highest sales tax in the United States next to California. In Charleston, South Carolina, the tax rates equals 10.5% with state tax, county tax, local option tax, and the hospitality tax. Some items have different rates; e.g., the tax is 3% on unprepared food items and 7% on sleeping accommodation rentals. Individuals 85 or older get a one-percent exclusion from the general sales tax. Counties may impose an additional 1% local option sales tax and other local sales taxes, and local governments may impose a local accommodations tax of up to 3%.

South Carolina imposes a casual excise tax of 5% on the fair market value of all motor vehicles, motorcycles, boats, motors and airplanes transferred between individuals. The maximum casual excise tax is $500.

Property tax is administered and collected by local governments with assistance from the South Carolina Department of Revenue. Both real and personal property are subject to tax. Approximately two-thirds of county-levied property taxes are used for the support of public education. Municipalities levy a tax on property situated within the limits of the municipality for services provided by the municipality. The tax is paid by individuals, corporations and partnerships owning property within the state. Intangible personal property is exempt from taxation. There is no inheritance tax.

Presidential elections through history

Notes

References